Wilho may refer to
Wilho Laine (1875–1918), Finnish politician
Oskari Wilho Louhivuori (1884–1953), Finnish politician
Wilho Saari, Finnish-American musician
Wilho Sipilä (1858–1917), Finnish Lutheran clergyman
Wilho Tilkanen (1885–1945), Finnish road racing cyclist

Finnish masculine given names